Reynolds House, and variations, may refer to:

Parker-Reynolds House, Anniston, Alabama, listed on the National Register of Historic Places (NRHP) in Calhoun County
Nelson House (Latham, Alabama), also known as the Reynolds House
James Culbertson Reynolds House, Monticello, Indiana
Joseph "Diamond Jo"  Reynolds Office Building and House, McGregor, Iowa, NRHP-listed in Clayton County
Anson O. Reynolds House, Des Moines, Iowa
Charles B. Reynolds Round Barn, Doon, Iowa
Isaac N. Reynolds House, Eaton Rapids, Michigan
James Reynolds House, Cape Girardeau, Missouri
Reynolds–Scherman House, Bernardsville, New Jersey, NRHP-listed in Somerset County
Barela-Reynolds House, Mesilla, New Mexico, listed on the NRHP
George Reynolds House, Cape Vincent, New York
Breese-Reynolds House, Hoosick, New York
Reynolds House (Poughkeepsie, New York)
Reynolds House (Asheville, North Carolina)
Dr. Carl V. Reynolds House, Asheville, North Carolina
Dempsey-Reynolds-Taylor House, Eden, North Carolina
Fewell-Reynolds House, Madison, North Carolina
James E. Reynolds House, Cameron, Oklahoma
John R. Reynolds House, Dayton, Ohio, NRHP-listed in Dayton
Baldwin-Reynolds House, Meadville, Pennsylvania, listed on the NRHP
Reynolds-Morris House, Philadelphia, Pennsylvania
Joseph Reynolds House, Bristol, Rhode Island
Grant J. Reynolds House, Sioux Falls, South Dakota, NRHP-listed in Minnehaha County 
Reynolds-Seaquist House, Mason, Texas, NRHP-listed in Mason County
Henry T. and Rebecca Reynolds House, Springville, Utah
John T. and Henry T. Reynolds, Jr., House, Springville, Utah
Reynolds Homestead, Critz, Virginia
Reynolds-Weed House, Elkhorn, Wisconsin